El mar de Lucas (1999) is an Argentine film, directed by Víctor Laplace, and written by Laplace and Martín Salinas.  The story features Víctor Laplace, Pablo Rago, Virginia Innocenti, and others.

Plot
The films tells of father, Juan Denevi (Victor Laplace), who gets the surprise of his life on his fiftieth birthday when he finds out that he's become a grandfather.  The movie opens in Buenos Aires, Argentina, and Juan is cooking individual personal favorite dishes for his friends, the patrons of his restaurant.

A young woman named Manuela (Virginia Innocentti) appears with a 3-year-old boy (Lucas) and announces that Lucas is Juan's grandson. Juan hasn't seen his son Facundo (Pablo Rago) for many years, and during this time, Facundo has married and had a son.

Facundo's wife and son find Juan at his birthday party and beg him to come help Facundo with a family crisis.

Cast
 Víctor Laplace as Juan Denevi
 Pablo Rago as Facundo Denevi
 Virginia Innocenti as Manuela
 Ana María Picchio as Clara
 Betiana Blum as Ana
 Rodolfo Ranni as Rolo
 Ulises Dumont as Nacho
 Lautaro Penella as Lucas Denevi
 Norberto Díaz as Secretario del intendente
 Adolfo Yanelli as Carlitos
 David Di Napoli as Martillero
 Pía Uribelarrea as Silvia
 Óscar Guzmán as Lalo
 Antonio Bax as Pedro
 Eugenia Tobal as Marisa

Awards
Wins
 Mar del Plata Film Festival: Special Mention, Víctor Laplace, for a first work; 1999.
 Cartagena Film Festival: Golden India Catalina, Best Screenplay, Víctor Laplace; 2000.

Nominations
 Cartagena Film Festival: Golden India Catalina, Best Film, Víctor Laplace; 2000.
 Argentine Film Critics Association Awards: Silver Condor, Best First Film, Víctor Laplace; Best Supporting Actress, Virginia Innocenti; 2001.

References

External links
 
 El mar de Lucas at the cinenacional.com 

1999 films
1999 drama films
Argentine independent films
1990s Spanish-language films